The Curtiss O-24 was a proposed observation aircraft designed by Curtiss-Wright.  It was to have been powered by a single Pratt & Whitney R-1340 Wasp radial engine, however, the project was canceled before any aircraft were built.

References 

O-24
United States military reconnaissance aircraft